Diploperla is a genus of springflies in the family Perlodidae.

Species
These five species belong to the genus Diploperla:
 Diploperla duplicata (Banks, 1920) (two-lobed springfly)
 Diploperla janeae Kondratieff & Verdone, 2017
 Diploperla kanawholensis Kirchner & Kondratieff, 1984
 Diploperla morgani Kondratieff & Voshell, 1979
 Diploperla robusta Stark & Gaufin, 1974

References

Further reading

 
 

Perlodidae
Articles created by Qbugbot